Costa Rica requires its residents to register their motor vehicles and display vehicle registration plates. The country has issued plates since at least 1923. The letters "CR" on plates into the early 1940s indicated the country name. The country name has been spelled out on the plates since at least 1944. In 1959 the legend "Centro America" [Central America] has appeared on the plates. Annual plates appear to have been issued through at least 1954. There were plates where the first two characters indicated what city the owner lived in. Multi-year base plates began to appear in 1955, but their use was not consistent until the mid-1960s. The current plate size is the North American standard of 6 × 12 inches (152 × 300 mm).

Early plates

2013 Series
New license plates for all vehicle were issued starting in mid 2013 and continuing until completed in early 2015. The design of these plates included additional security features, such as a hologram at the left side, a security strip running across the plate, and additional elements that are now found throughout most countries.

Regular series plates

Special series plates

References

Costa Rica
Transport in Costa Rica
Costa Rica transport-related lists